Bayaney is a rural barrio in the municipality of Hatillo, Puerto Rico. Its population in 2010 was 3,550.

Description
Puerto Rico Highway 487 travels through Bayaney.

History
Puerto Rico was ceded by Spain in the aftermath of the Spanish–American War under the terms of the Treaty of Paris of 1898 and became an unincorporated territory of the United States. In 1899, the United States Department of War conducted a census of Puerto Rico finding that the population of Bayaney barrio was 1,394.

Gallery
Homes and street as one is traveling south to north on PR-487 in Bayaney:

See also

 List of communities in Puerto Rico

References

External links

Barrios of Hatillo, Puerto Rico